Tolokonnikov is a Russian masculine surname. Its feminine counterpart is Tolokonnikova. It may refer to:

Konstantin Tolokonnikov (born 1996), Russian middle-distance runner 
Nadezhda Tolokonnikova (born 1989), Russian conceptual artist and political activist
Vladimir Tolokonnikov (1943 - 2017), Soviet actor
Vladimir Tolokonnikov (born 1973), Soviet and Russian ice hockey player

Russian-language surnames